The Socialist Party (PS), also known as Socialista Obrero (Socialist Worker's), was a pro-statehood political party in Puerto Rico, that also contemplated independence in the case that entry into the American Union was denied by Congress. The party was concerned with improving the social welfare of Puerto Ricans.

It was founded on 18 July 1899 as the Labor Party (Partido Obrero), and was also known as the Socialist Worker's Party by Santiago Iglesias Pantín, an early leader of the Puerto Rican labor movement who was influenced by the Socialist Labor Party of America. It was formally re-founded as the PS on March 21, 1915, in the town of Cayey. It originally served as the political arm of the Free Federation of Workers, which became the Puerto Rican branch of the American Federation of Labor. The party was an affiliate of the Socialist Party of America.

In Puerto Rican elections, the Socialist Party garnered 24,468 votes in 1917 (14 percent) and 59,140 votes in 1920 (23.5 percent). Over time, Iglesias and the Socialists became more in favor of statehood and worked with the pro-annexation Republican Party, joining them in an electoral alliance known as the Coalition which dominated island politics from 1932 to 1940. The Socialists won seven seats to the island's constitutional convention, which convened between 1951 and 1952.

Demise
The party disbanded before elections in 1956, and the leadership directed party members to join the Popular Democratic Party (PPD).

Further reading 
James L. Dietz, Economic History of Puerto Rico: Institutional Change and Capitalist Development (Princeton University Press, 1986) 
Miles Galvin, The Organized Labor Movement in Puerto Rico (London: Associated University Press, 1979)

References

Defunct political parties in Puerto Rico
Statehood movement in Puerto Rico
Socialism in Puerto Rico
Socialist parties in North America
1899 establishments in Puerto Rico
Political parties established in 1899
1950s disestablishments in Puerto Rico
Political parties disestablished in the 1950s